is a Japanese actor based in London, UK.

Career
Ishida was trained from the age of three in traditional Japanese Noh and Kyogen theater by his father and his father's master. He has performed at theaters in Japan, and at the Carnegie Hall in New York, and Shakespeare's Globe in London.

When he was 15, he moved to England to study at the Guildhall School of Music and Drama. After graduation, he formed his own theater company, "Tea Leaf Theatre".

Filmography
 Beneath (2011), as The Wolf
 Gambit (2012), as Akihira Kontaro
 The Railway Man (2013), as the young Takashi Nagase
  (2013)
 47 Ronin (2013), as Shogun's Adjutant

References

External links
 

Living people
Japanese male actors
Alumni of the Guildhall School of Music and Drama
Japanese expatriates in the United Kingdom
Noh
1987 births
People from Tokyo
Male actors from Tokyo